Elvin Charles Stakman (May 17, 1885 – January 22, 1979) was an American plant pathologist who was a pioneer of methods of identifying and combatting disease in wheat.

Career
Stakman was the advisor for Margaret Newton, who completed her Doctor of Philosophy (Ph.D.) studies in 1922, who became an internationally renowned phytopathologist in the study of stem rust.

Stakman married the plant pathologist Estelle Louise Jensen in 1917.

He also had a major hand in influencing Norman Borlaug to pursue a career in phytopathology. In 1938, in a speech entitled "These Shifty Little Enemies that Destroy our Food Crops", Stakman discussed the manifestation of the plant disease rust, a parasitic fungus that feeds on phytonutrients, in wheat, oat and barley crops across the US. He had discovered that special plant breeding methods created plants resistant to rust. His research greatly interested Borlaug, and when Borlaug's job at the Forest Service was eliminated due to budget cuts, he asked Stakman if he should go into forest pathology. Stakman advised him to focus on plant pathology instead, and Borlaug subsequently re-enrolled to the University of Minnesota to study plant pathology under Stakman. Borlaug went on to discover varieties of dwarf wheat that helped reduce famine in India, Pakistan, and other countries, and received the Nobel Peace Prize for his work in 1970.

Death and legacy
Stakman died in 1979 of a stroke.

In Stakman's honor, Stakman Hall was named for him on the University of Minnesota's St. Paul campus, providing space for Plant Pathology and related fields.

References

Notes

External links

 
 
 Elvin C. Stakman papers, University Archives, University of Minnesota - Twin Cities: http://archives.lib.umn.edu/repositories/14/resources/1744

1885 births
1979 deaths
American botanists
American mycologists
University of Minnesota alumni
People from Saint Paul, Minnesota